Jarvis Tatum (October 11, 1946 – January 6, 2003) was an American professional baseball player. Tatum appeared in 102 Major League Baseball games, primarily as a center fielder, over parts of three seasons for the California Angels (1968–1970).

Tatum was selected by the Angels in the 16th round of the 1965 Major League Baseball Draft after graduating from Fresno's Edison High School. His first two partial seasons in MLB came in post-September-1 trials with the Angels, when rosters expanded to 40 players. Getting into 75 games, with 44 starts in the outfield, he batted .238. However, he failed to hit for power (with only seven extra base hits, all doubles) and stole only one base. On October 11, 1970, the Angels packaged him with second baseman Doug Griffin and pitcher Ken Tatum (no relation) to the Boston Red Sox for slugging outfielder Tony Conigliaro, pitcher Ray Jarvis and catcher Gerry Moses. Jarvis Tatum never reported to the Red Sox; after getting his release from Boston in April 1971 he played for Yakult in the Japanese Central League for one year. He returned to the United States for a brief appearance at the Triple-A level in 1972 and the Mexican League in 1973.

As a big leaguer, he batted .232 with 59 hits, 51 of them singles, and eight runs batted in. He died at age 56 in Los Angeles.

External links

1946 births
2003 deaths
African-American baseball players
Algodoneros de Unión Laguna players
American expatriate baseball players in Japan
Baseball players from California
California Angels players
El Paso Sun Kings players
Hawaii Islanders players
Major League Baseball center fielders
Quad Cities Angels players
Seattle Angels players
Sportspeople from Fresno, California
Yakult Atoms players
20th-century African-American sportspeople
21st-century African-American people
American expatriate baseball players in Mexico
Florida Instructional League Phillies players
Arizona Instructional League Angels players
San Jose Bees players